Peter Rundel (born 1958 in Friedrichshafen), is a German violinist and conductor. A recipient of the Grand Prix du Disque in 1998 for his recording of Jean Barraqué's complete works, he became conductor of the Royal Philharmonic Orchestra of Flanders in 1999 and the musical director of the Wiener Taschenoper since 2000. Since 2005, he has been conductor of the Remix Ensemble in Casa da Música, Porto, Portugal.

See also
Ensemble Modern

References

External links 
 Peter Rundel Klangforum Wien
 Peter Rundel Karsten Witt Musikmanagement

APRA Award winners
German male conductors (music)
German violinists
German male violinists
1958 births
Living people
People from Friedrichshafen
21st-century German conductors (music)
21st-century violinists
21st-century German male musicians